Curse of the Deserted is a 2010 Chinese horror film directed by Law Chi-leung and written by Cheung Chi-Kwong and Cai Jun, and starring Shawn Yue, Zhang Yuqi, Fu Miao, and Yue Xiaojun. The film is an adaptation of Cai Jun's novel of the same name.

Cast
 Shawn Yue as Guo Jing, a Chinese novelist, Xiaozhi's boyfriend.
 Zhang Yuqi as Ouyang Xiaozhi/ Huang Xiaozhi, Guo Jing's girlfriend.
 Fu Miao as A teacher, Sun Zichu's girlfriend.
 Yue Xiaojun as Sun Zichu, a scientist.

Other
 Liu Shuhan as Han Xiaofeng.
 Qin Zihan as Chun Yu.
 Dai Xu as Su Tianping.
 Li Zefeng as Huo Qiang.
 Hai Yitian as Ye Xiao.
 Shi Liuyi as Yan Zhi.
 Wu Xiaoliang
 Zhu Nuolin

Production
This film was shot in Tianjin, including Taida Library, Sadajie, and  Binhai New Area.

Release
The film premiered in Beijing on 12 August 2010 and was released in China on 13 August 2010.

References

External links
 
 

Chinese horror films
2010 horror films
2010 films
Films based on Chinese novels